Turbonilla laminata is a species of sea snail, a marine gastropod mollusk in the family Pyramidellidae, the pyrams and their allies.

Description
The shell has the shape of an elongate cone. Its length measures 6.25 mm. Its color is yellowish or fulvous, more or less distinctly narrowly fasciate with lighter color on the spire, and bifasciate on the body whorl. The protoconch contains two whorls. The eight whorls of the teleoconch are convex. They contain a deep suture. They are longitudinally and spirally ribbed. The interstices of the decussations appear as pitted. On the body whorl the longitudinal sculpture becomes evanescent below the periphery

Distribution
This species occurs in the Pacific Ocean off San Diego, California.

References

External links
 To World Register of Marine Species

laminata
Gastropods described in 1864